QV66 is the tomb of Nefertari, the Great Wife of Pharaoh Ramesses II, in Egypt's Valley of the Queens. It was discovered by Ernesto Schiaparelli (the director of the Egyptian Museum in Turin) in 1904. It is called the Sistine Chapel of Ancient Egypt. Nefertari, which means "beautiful companion", was Ramesses II's favorite wife; he went out of his way to make this obvious, referring to her as "the one for whom the sun shines" in his writings, built the Temple of Hathor to idolize her as a deity, and commissioned portraiture wall paintings.  In the Valley of the Queens, Nefertari's tomb once held the mummified body and representative symbolisms of her, consistent with most Egyptian tombs of the period. Now, everything had been looted except for two thirds of the 5,200 square feet of wall paintings. For what still remains, these wall paintings characterized Nefertari's character. Her face received particular attention to emphasize her beauty, especially the shape of her eyes, the blush of her cheeks, and her eyebrows. Some paintings were full of lines and color of red, blue, yellow, and green that portrayed exquisite directions to navigating through the afterlife to paradise.

Decoration and layout

A flight of steps cut out of the rock gives access to the antechamber, which is decorated with paintings based on Chapter 17 of the Book of the Dead. This astronomical ceiling represents the heavens and is painted in dark blue, with a myriad of golden five-pointed stars. The east wall of the antechamber is interrupted by a large opening flanked by representation of Osiris at left and Anubis at right; this in turn leads to the side chamber, decorated with offering scenes, preceded by a vestibule in which the paintings portray Nefertari being presented to the gods who welcome her. On the north wall of the antechamber is the stairway that goes down to the burial chamber. This latter is a vast quadrangular room covering a surface area about 90 square meters, the astronomical ceiling of which is supported by four pillars entirely covered with decoration. Originally, the queen's red granite sarcophagus lay in the middle of this chamber. According to religious doctrines of the time, it was in this chamber, which the ancient Egyptians called the "golden hall" that the regeneration of the deceased took place. This decorative pictogram of the walls in the burial chamber drew inspirations from chapters 144 and 146 of the Book of the Dead: in the left half of the chamber, there are passages from chapter 144 concerning the gates and doors of the kingdom of Osiris, their guardians, and the magic formulas that had to be uttered by the deceased in order to go past the doors.

The tomb itself is primarily focused on the Queen's life and on her death. Of the wall full of paintings, the "Queen playing Draughts" is a portrayal of Nefertari playing the game of Senet. A whole entire wall was dedicated to show the Queen at play, demonstrating the importance of the game of Senet. Interpretations suggest that a physical board game of Senet may have possibly been stolen, along with the body and other symbolic images of Nefertari. Nefertari may have been very clever, and possibly have been a writer in her lifetime. ^4 This can be alluded because of a painting in the tomb of Nefertari coming before the god of writing and literacy, Thoth, to proclaim her title as a scribe. Nefertari lived an elegant life on earth, and she is also promised an elegant afterlife. Chapter 17 of the Book of the Dead, which tells a spell for the Queen, is inscribed on the tomb. This spell is supposed to guide Nefertari on how to transform into a ba, which is a bird. For Nefertari to become a bird in the afterlife holds a promise of freedom to move around.

By contemporary standards, the real value of the paintings found within the tomb is that they are the best preserved and most detailed source of the ancient Egyptian's journey towards the afterlife. The tomb features several extracts from the Book of the Dead from chapters 148, 94, 146, 17 and 144 and tells of all the ceremonies and tests taking place from the death of Nefertari up until the end of her journey, depicted on the door of her burial chamber, in which Nefertari is reborn and emerges from the eastern horizon as a sun disc, forever immortalized in victory over the world of darkness.

The details of the ceremonies concerning the afterlife also tell us much about the duties and roles of many major and minor gods during the reign of the 19th Dynasty in the New Kingdom. Gods mentioned on the tomb walls include Isis, Osiris, Anubis, Hathor, Neith, Serket, Ma'at, Wadjet, Nekhbet, Amunet, Ra, Nephthys, Khepri, Amun, and Horus.

Unfortunately by the time that Schiaparelli rediscovered Nefertari's tomb it had already been found by tomb raiders, who had stolen all the treasure buried with the Queen, including her sarcophagus and mummy. Parts of the mummy's knees were found in the burial chamber, and were taken to the Egyptian Museum in Turin by Schiaparelli, where they are still kept today.

Closure
The tomb was closed to the public in 1950 because of various problems that threatened the paintings, which are considered to be the best preserved and most eloquent decorations of any Egyptian burial site. The paintings are found on almost every available surface in the tomb, including thousands of stars painted on the ceiling of the burial chamber on a blue background to represent the sky.

After the discovery of the tomb, scientists found deterioration in many paintings caused by water damage, bacterial growth, salt formation, and recently, the humidity of visitors' breath. In 1986, an operation to restore all the paintings within the tomb and to replace over 3,000 years worth of dust and soot with paper pasted to the fragile walls and ceilings to preserve the paintings was embarked upon by the Egyptian Antiquities Organisation and the Getty Conservation Institute; the actual restoration work began in 1988 and was completed in April 1992. Upon completion of the restoration work, Egyptian authorities decided to severely restrict public access to the tomb in order to preserve the delicate paintings found within. Five years later, Egypt's Prime Minister, Hisham Zazao, declared the tomb to be reopened to visitors, 150 visitors at a time. In 2006, the tomb was restricted to visitors once again, except for private tours of a maximum of 20 people purchasing a license for US$3000.
As of November 2019, holders of a 1400 EGP entry ticket or a premium Luxor pass can visit this tomb. To this day, the Getty Conservation Institute regularly monitors the tomb.

Gallery

See also
 List of Ancient Egyptian royal consorts

References

External links

Buildings and structures completed in the 13th century BC
Valley of the Queens
Nefertari